Lupfig railway station is a railway station in the municipality of Lupfig, in the Swiss canton of Aargau. It is an intermediate stop on the standard gauge Brugg–Hendschiken line of Swiss Federal Railways.

The station was built in 1994 and replaced Birrfeld railway station, 300 m away.

Services
The following services stop at Lupfig:

 Aargau S-Bahn:

References

External links 
 
 

Railway stations in the canton of Aargau
Swiss Federal Railways stations